Godfrey Timmins (6 September 1927 – 11 April 2001) was an Irish Fine Gael politician who served in Dáil Éireann from 1968 to 1987 and from 1989 to 1997.

Early and personal life
Born in Weaver's Square, Baltinglass, County Wicklow, he was the eldest of four children. His father had been a Sinn Féin representative on the Baltinglass Board of Guardians, one of three Benchmen in the Republican court during the Irish War of Independence, a pro-Treaty Cumann na nGaedheal supporter, and later a Fine Gael Councillor. His mother Kitty (née Godfrey) was a native of Ballyhaunis, County Mayo. He was known by his mother's maiden surname, Godfrey, to distinguish him from his father.

He attended secondary school at the Patrician College, Tullow and later at Naas Christian Brothers School. After finishing school he worked in the family business and as a farmer and butcher in Baltinglass.

He was a keen Gaelic footballer. In 1946 he was the Baltinglass club delegate to the Wicklow County GAA Board. He served as Chairman of the local club from 1952 to 1970 and club President from 1971 until his death in 2001.

Political career
Timmins became active in politics with Fine Gael. In the local elections of 1950 he succeeded in being the only Fine Gael candidate elected to Wicklow County Council. He was re-elected at each subsequent local election, and was a member of the council for 49 years. He held the position of Chairman on the Council on four occasions (1975, 1978, 1981 and 1996).

He also served on the county council's committee on Agriculture, Wicklow VEC and the Eastern Health Board.

Timmins was elected to the 18th Dáil as a Fine Gael Teachta Dála (TD) for the Wicklow constituency at the April 1968 by-election caused by the death of Labour Party TD James Everett. He was re-elected at each subsequent general election until he lost in 1987. Refusing to stand for the Seanad, he regained his seat at the next general election and remained as a TD until he retired at the 1997 general election. He was succeeded in Dáil Éireann by his son Billy Timmins.

During his time in the Dáil he served as a member of the Committee on Procedure and Privileges, the Committee of Selection and the Committee of Accounts. He was Fine Gael Chief Whip from 1972 to 1973.

He collapsed and died while attending a GAA match in Dunlavin in April 2001. He left an estate worth €3.5m in 2003.

See also
Families in the Oireachtas

References

1927 births
2001 deaths
Fine Gael TDs
Gaelic games club administrators
Gaelic games players from County Wicklow
Irish sportsperson-politicians
Local councillors in County Wicklow
Members of the 18th Dáil
Members of the 19th Dáil
Members of the 20th Dáil
Members of the 21st Dáil
Members of the 22nd Dáil
Members of the 23rd Dáil
Members of the 24th Dáil
Members of the 26th Dáil
Members of the 27th Dáil